The 2017–18 Vijay Hazare Trophy was the 16th season of the Vijay Hazare Trophy, a List A cricket tournament in India. It was contested by the 28 domestic cricket teams of India. The following seven teams were drawn in Group B: Bengal, Delhi, Himachal Pradesh, Kerala, Maharashtra, Tripura and Uttar Pradesh. In December 2017, the fixtures were brought forward to allow players to practice ahead of the 2018 Indian Premier League.

Points table

Fixtures

Round 1

Round 2

Round 3

Round 4

Round 5

Round 6

Round 7

References

External links
 Series home at ESPN Cricinfo

Vijay Hazare Trophy
Vijay Hazare Trophy
Vijay Hazare Trophy